Videbæk is a town, with a population of 4,242 (1 January 2022), located in Ringkøbing-Skjern Municipality, Region Midtjylland, at the road between Ringkøbing and Herning. It was the municipal seat of the former Videbæk Municipality.  

Videbæk is known for Per Arnoldi's large corten steel sculpture in the shape of a V, known as "The V", which is found at a roundabout at the entrance to the town.  The sculpture was dedicated on 15 August 1996.

Constructions 
The Videbæk Transmitter is one of the tallest masts in Denmark.

Attractions 

The town has a local area museum (Videbæk Egnsmuseum) that opened in 2002 on an old family farm with stables, barn, and machine house.  The collection features farm and handicrafts machinery and tools, as well as household daily items that are typical of the daily life in the area.  It also has a collection of Danish elves (nisser) dolls that were donated by Ellen Bredahl, formerly holder of the Guinness Record for the largest collection of these popular Danish dolls.

The art pavilion Vestjyllands Kunstpavillon (VK) opened in 2017, designed by Henning Larsen Architects. It is situated in a small park and exhibits changing artists and hosts concerts, lectures and cultural events. Architect Henning Larsen grew up around Videbæk and the art pavilion has some of his artwork on permanent display. There is also a permanent museum dedicated to Danish artist Arne Haugen Sørensen.

Videbæk Municipality
The former Videbæk Municipality covered an area of 289 km2, and had a total population of 12,140 (2005). Its last mayor was Torben Nørregaard, a member of the Venstre (Liberal party) political party.

Creation
 Brejning Parish
 Brejning Parish
 Nørre Vium Parish
 Troldhede Parish
 Videbæk Parish
 Vorgod Parish.

Cessation
On January 1, 2007, Videbæk municipality ceased to exist due to Kommunalreformen ("The Municipality Reform" of 2007).  It was merged with Egvad, Holmsland, Ringkøbing, and Skjern municipalities to form the new Ringkøbing-Skjern Municipality.  This created a municipality with an area of 1,485 km2 and a total population of 57,818 (2005).

Description
There is much agriculture in the former municipality, as well as some large industry. Denmark's largest dairy company, Arla Foods (North Vium facility), is located in the former municipality.

Videbæk municipality was recognised as the Year's Environment Municipality (Årets Miljøkommunne) in 1991, the Year's Entrepreneurial Municipality (Årets Iværksætterkommune) in 1992, and one of four Green City Municipalities in 1993–1994.

Notable people 
 Jens Lund (1873 in Videbæk - 1946) a Danish sculptor
 Henning Larsen (1925-2013), architect. He grew up around Videbæk
 Jens Berthel Askou (born 1982 in Videbæk) a Danish football coach and former professional footballer
 Ida (born 1994 in Videbæk) stage name of Ida Østergaard Madsen, a Danish singer who won the Danish X Factor

References

 Municipal statistics: NetBorger Kommunefakta, delivered from KMD aka Kommunedata (Municipal Data)
 Municipal mergers and neighbors: Eniro new municipalities map

External links

 Ringkøbing-Skjern municipality's official website
 Learn what Videbæk can offer tourists

Former municipalities of Denmark
Cities and towns in the Central Denmark Region
Ringkøbing-Skjern Municipality